
Grzimek's Animal Life Encyclopedia is a large comprehensive encyclopedia of animal life. It is named after its original editor in chief, Bernhard Grzimek.

Originally the encyclopedia was published as a 13-volume set in German under the name Grzimeks Tierleben (Grzimek's Animal Life) in 1967-1972; it was translated into English in 1972-75. The encyclopedia was an international collaboration by a large number of scientists including Theodor Haltenorth, Wolfgang Gewalt, Heinz-Georg Klös, Konrad Lorenz, Heinz Heck, Lutz Heck, Jean Dorst, Constantine Walter Benson, Irenäus Eibl-Eibesfeldt, Helmut Sick, Heini Hediger, Wolfgang Makatsch, Erich Thenius, Erna Mohr, Adolf Portmann, Nagamichi Kuroda, Lester L. Short, Gerlof Fokko Mees, and Andrew John Berger. It was later extensively updated and republished in a 17-volume second edition under the supervision of Michael Hutchins in 2003. Some university libraries offer access to a digitized version of the second edition. The German edition also published three supplementary volumes: Entwicklungsgeschichte der Lebewesen (History of Life), Verhaltensforschung (Behavioural Research) and Unsere Umwelt als Lebensraum - Ökologie (Our Environment as Living Space - Ecology).

Online portal
In fall 2009, Gale Cengage released a web-based version of the encyclopedia, with access to the web site by subscription. The site allows users to rate articles and to submit videos and photography.

Volumes for original 1967-1972 Edition
Volume 1: Lower Animals (Protozoa, Sponges, Cnidarians, "Worms", Non-Hexapod Arthropods)
Volume 2: Insects (Springtails and Relatives, Insects)
Volume 3: Mollusks and Echinoderms (Mollusks, "Lophophorates", Non-Vertebrate Deuterostomes)
Volume 4: Fishes 1
Volume 5: Fishes 2 and Amphibia
Volume 6: Reptiles
Volume 7-9: Birds
Volume 10-13: Mammals

Volumes for 2003 Edition
Volume 1: Lower Metazoans and Lesser Deuterostomes
Volume 2: Protostomes
Volume 3: Insects
Volume 4-5: Fish
Volume 6: Amphibians
Volume 7: Reptiles
Volume 8-11: Birds
Volume 12-16: Mammals
Volume 17: Index

See also
Brehms Tierleben
Taxonomy of the animals (Hutchins et al., 2003)

References

External links
Bernhard Grzimek, George M. Narita: Grzimek’s animal life encyclopedia (1. edition, online)

Zoology books
Encyclopedias of science
English-language encyclopedias
German encyclopedias
1967 non-fiction books
1972 non-fiction books
2003 non-fiction books
20th-century encyclopedias